Laura Ellman is a Democratic member of the Illinois Senate for the 21st district. The district, located in the Chicago metropolitan area includes all or parts of Bloomingdale, Carol Stream, Lisle, Naperville, Warrenville, West Chicago, Winfield, and Wheaton.

Career 
Ellman defeated incumbent Republican Senator Michael Connelly in the 2018 Illinois general election by 1179 votes. Ellman, a senior independent assessor at Argonne National Laboratory, has a degree in mathematics from Grinnell College and a masters in applied statistics from the University of Iowa.

As of July 2022, Senator Ellman is a member of the following Illinois Senate committees:

 Agriculture Committee (SAGR)
 (Chairwoman of) Appropriations - Revenue and Finance Committee (SAPP-SARF)
 Energy and Public Utilities Committee (SENE)
 (Chairwoman of) Financial Institutions Committee (SFIC)
 Higher Education Committee (SCHE)
 (Chairwoman of) Next Generation of Energy Committee (SENE-ENGE)
 Redistricting - DuPage County Committee (SRED-SRDC)
 (Chairwoman of) Subcommittee on Next Generation Nuclear (SENE-SNGN)
 Transportation Committee (STRN)

References

External links
 Laura Ellman for 21st District State Senate official campaign site

Year of birth missing (living people)
21st-century American politicians
21st-century American women politicians
Argonne National Laboratory people
Grinnell College alumni
Democratic Party Illinois state senators
Politicians from Naperville, Illinois
University of Iowa alumni
Women state legislators in Illinois
Living people